The Disciples Ecumenical Consultative Council (DECC) a.k.a. Disciples of Christ World Communion is a Reformed Restorationist Christian denomination. It is an associate member of the World Communion of Reformed Churches. The headquarters is in Indianapolis.

History
The Council has its origins in a meeting organized by the Christian Church (Disciples of Christ) in Nairobi during the World Council of Churches conference in 1975. The Council was officially founded in 1979 in Kingston, Jamaica by 12 denominations. According to a denomination census released in 2020, it claimed 19 member denominations and 4.5 million members.

Beliefs 
The Council is an associate member of the World Communion of Reformed Churches.

References

External links
 Official website

International bodies of Reformed denominations
Christian Church (Disciples of Christ)